Fluorocitric acid is a fluorinated carboxylic acid derived from citric acid by substitution of one hydrogen by a fluorine atom. The appropriate anion is called fluorocitrate. Fluorocitrate is formed in two steps from fluoroacetate. Fluoroacetate is first converted to fluoroacetyl-CoA by acetyl-CoA synthetase in the mitochondria. Then fluoroacetyl-CoA condenses with oxaloacetate to form fluorocitrate. This step is catalyzed by citrate synthase. Flurocitrate is a metabolite of fluoroacetic acid and is very toxic because it is not processable using aconitase in the citrate cycle (where fluorocitrate takes place of citrate as the substrate). The enzyme is inhibited and the cycle stops working.

See also 
 Citric acid
 Fluoroacetic acid
 Citrate cycle

References

External links 
PubChem: Fluorocitrate
Human Metabolome Database (HMDB): Fluorocitric acid  
The Chemical and Biochemical Properties of Fluorocitric Acid Pdf

Tricarboxylic acids
Organofluorides
Fluorohydrins
Respiratory toxins
Aconitase inhibitors
Fluorinated carboxylic acids